Pseudosymmoca is a genus of moth in the family Gelechiidae. It contains the species Pseudosymmoca angustipennis, which is found in the Sahara.

References

Gelechiidae